John Musgrove is a Democratic Party member of the Montana House of Representatives, representing District 34 since 2000.

External links
Montana House of Representatives - John L. Musgrove official MT State Legislature website
Project Vote Smart - Representative John Musgrove (MT) profile
Follow the Money - John Musgrove
2006 2004 2002 2000 campaign contributions

Members of the Montana House of Representatives
Living people
People from Havre, Montana
Year of birth missing (living people)